The following is a list of episodes from the series T.O.T.S..  Like other Disney Junior shows from the time, the episode titles are spoken, but do not appear in text.

Series overview

Episodes

Season 1 (2019–20)

Season 2 (2020–21)

Season 3 (2021–22)

Shorts

Calling All T.O.T.S.

Season 1
Mia the Kitten
Ellie Elephant
Pablo Puppy
Wyatt Whale
Pearl Piglet
Precious Panda
Marty Monkey
Blondie Bunny
Sunny Sloth
Didi Deer

Season 2
Sandy Sea Turtle
Sebastian Seal
Gio Giraffe 
Bucky Bull 
Peggy and Paul Polar Bears
Stanley Shark
Hazel Husky
The Bunny Bunch
Mia and Lucky
Lily Lemur

References

Lists of American children's animated television series episodes